Koba Gvenetadze (born 26 December 1971) has been Governor of the National Bank of Georgia since March 2016.

Education and career
Gvenetadze was educated at Tbilisi State University and graduated with a masters in economics from The American University in Washington, D.C. He was formerly Deputy Minister of Finance and a Deputy State Minister, before serving as a Senior Economist at the International Monetary Fund between 2002 and 2015.

Other activities
International Monetary Fund (IMF), Ex-Officio Member of the Board of Governors (since 2016)

Awards and honors
Gvenetadze was ranked among the Best Central Bankers by "Global Finance" five times (2018, 2019, 2020, 2021, 2022).

References

Presidents of the National Bank of Georgia
1971 births
Living people
Tbilisi State University alumni
American University alumni
Economists from Georgia (country)